San Martino in Pensilis is a comune (municipality) in the Province of Campobasso in the Italian region Molise, located about  northeast of Campobasso.The settlement was formerly inhabited by an Arbëreshë community, who have since assimilated.

San Martino in Pensilis borders the following municipalities: Campomarino, Chieti, Guglionesi, Larino, Portocannone, Rotello, Serracapriola, Ururi.

Transportation 
San Martino in Pensilis have  a railway station, the San Martino in Pensilis railway station, on the Termoli-Campobasso and Termoli Venafro line.

But the station has been closed for a few years and does not have passenger service.

References

Arbëresh settlements

Cities and towns in Molise